Ardross Castle was a c.14th century castle that was located in Elie and Earlsferry, Fife, Scotland, near the sea.

History
The Dishington family built the castle, but sold it to Sir William Scott of Elie in 1607. At the end of the 17th century is passed to Sir William Anstruther.

Structure
The castle is in ruins, with the vaulted basement visible above ground, along with the ruins of a later block.

References

External links

Ruined castles in Fife
Demolished buildings and structures in Scotland
Former castles in Scotland
Scheduled Ancient Monuments in Fife